Peter Edwin Storey (born 7 September 1945) is a former England international footballer. Able to play at full-back or more commonly as a defensive midfielder, he picked up a reputation in the Football League as an aggressive player in the 1960s and 1970s.

He turned professional at his boyhood club Arsenal in 1962, and became a first team regular after making his debut in 1965. He spent 15 years at the club, winning the
Inter-Cities Fairs Cup in 1970, the First Division title in 1970–71, and the FA Cup in 1971. He was also a losing finalist in the 1968 and 1969 League Cup and the 1972 FA Cup Final. He also won 19 caps for England between 1971 and 1973. He was transferred to Fulham in 1977 before announcing his retirement eight months later.

After retiring from football he was convicted of various criminal offences; including keeping a brothel, and was jailed for three years for financing a plot to counterfeit gold coins. He has been married four times and has three sons and one daughter; he lives in southern France with his fourth wife.

Early life
Storey was born on 7 September 1945 in Farnham, Surrey, to Edwin, a carpenter and builder, and Nellie, a part-time shop assistant. As a child he would occasionally accompany his father to matches at the Recreation Ground to see Aldershot play in the Fourth Division. However, he began supporting Arsenal from an early age. From the age of 11 he was coached by former Aldershot striker Charlie Mortimore for the Aldershot and Farnborough Schools Football Association. He soon attracted the attention of Arsenal with his performances at schoolboy level, and impressed across the back four enough to represent England Schoolboys.

Club career

Arsenal
Storey signed as an apprentice at Arsenal after leaving school in 1961. As a young player he was focused on his career, and was not interested in frequenting nightclubs with his fellow apprentices. He signed professional forms in September 1962 and spent the 1962–63 season playing for the Arsenal third team in the Metropolitan League. A buildup of senior player on the books at Arsenal meant that Storey had little chance to play for the reserve team.

He made his senior debut on 30 October 1965, taking Billy McCullough's place at left-back in a 3–1 defeat to Leicester City at Filbert Street. The Daily Telegraph reported that he had a "promising" game against a "clever" opponent in right-winger Jackie Sinclair. He retained his first team place and went on to play all of the remaining 29 games, though the season would prove to be a poor one for the "Gunners" as manager Billy Wright was sacked after dropping top-scorer Joe Baker and disillusioning the dressing room. Arsenal finished in 14th place in 1965–66, just four points above the relegation zone, and were knocked out of the FA Cup at the Third Round following a 3–0 defeat to Blackburn Rovers, who would end the season bottom of the First Division.

Storey quickly made a name for himself as a rough player early in the 1966–67 season as he injured Manchester City winger Mike Summerbee; the Daily Express reported that "Storey... is overdoing the tough guy act". He was warned by new manager Bertie Mee not to get sent off after Storey got involved in a brawl during an FA Cup win over Gillingham. The team improved under Mee's strict leadership, and finished the season in seventh place, cutting goals conceded to 47 from the previous season's tally of 75. Storey started 34 league games, missing eight matches due to injury and illness. He scored his first professional goal on 22 April 1967, in a 1–1 draw with Nottingham Forest at Highbury.

Bob McNab established himself at left-back in the 1967–68 season, and so Storey was moved over to right-back. Despite being a full-back he was sometimes given the job of marking a dangerous and creative opposition player closely, and though he was never ordered to use rough play he was on these occasions told "you know what to do, Peter". He was sent off for the first time in his career, along with Frank McLintock, in a 1–0 defeat to Burnley at Turf Moor in December 1967; despite his tough tackling he was actually dismissed for bad language. Arsenal finished the season in ninth place, but advanced past Coventry City, Reading, Blackburn Rovers, Burnley and Huddersfield Town to face Leeds United in the final of the League Cup at Wembley. Leeds won the game through a Terry Cooper volley on 20 minutes, and Arsenal barely created any chances in the game.

Arsenal reached fourth place in the 1968–69 season after conceding just 27 league goals, and advanced past Sunderland, Scunthorpe United, Liverpool, Blackpool and North London rivals Tottenham Hotspur to reach the final against Third Division side Swindon Town. Swindon won the match 3–1, with left-winger Don Rogers scoring two extra-time goals after evading the close attentions of Storey.

Their league position meant in 1968–69 that Arsenal qualified for the Inter-Cities Fairs Cup in the 1969–70 season, and they advanced past Glentoran (Northern Ireland), Sporting (Portugal), Rouen (France), FCM Bacău (Romania) and Ajax (Netherlands) to reach the final against Belgian club Anderlecht. Anderlecht won 3–1 at the Constant Vanden Stock Stadium after their possession football controlled the entire game until substitute Ray Kennedy scored a crucial header in the 82nd minute. Arsenal turned around the tie with a 3–0 home victory to claim the club's first trophy in 17 years. Despite their European exploits the team still struggled in England, and finished the league in 12th spot.

They defended their European trophy up until the quarter-finals, knocking out Lazio (Italy), SK Sturm Graz (Austria) and K.S.K. Beveren (Belgium), before losing to German side 1. FC Köln on away goals despite a rare goal from Storey. The First Division title race was contested largely between Arsenal and Leeds, and the "Gunners" recovered from an indifferent winter to claim nine successive victories between 2 March and 20 April and eventually they finished on 65 points, one place and one point above Leeds. The most crucial match of the campaign came against Leeds at Elland Road on 25 April, which Leeds won 1–0 after an injury-time goal from Jack Charlton. During the game Billy Bremner stamped on Storey's face, though this was an accidental collision during a goalmouth scramble. Arsenal won the title on the final day of the season with a 1–0 win over Spurs at White Hart Lane, though Storey missed the final two league games of the season after damaging ligaments in his ankle. They secured the double in 1970–71 after winning the FA Cup, though their progress in the competition was slow, as they beat Yeovil Town, Portsmouth (in a replay) – Storey scored a penalty in both the original tie and the replay, Manchester City, Leicester City (in a replay), and then Stoke City (in a replay). Storey gave a man-of-the-match performance in the original semi-final tie against Stoke at Hillsborough, scoring two goals to rescue a 2–0 half-time deficit; with the first goal he beat Gordon Banks with a volley on the edge of the penalty area, and with the second he sent Banks the wrong way with an injury-time penalty kick. The replay at Villa Park was less dramatic, and Arsenal won the tie with a comfortable 2–0 result. In the final he was assigned to mark Liverpool's Steve Heighway, and kept the Liverpool winger quiet until Storey was substituted for Eddie Kelly after 64 minutes. Both Heighway and Kelly scored in extra-time, but the winning goal came from "Gunners" striker Charlie George.

He helped Arsenal to get off to a solid start in defence of their title in the 1971–72 campaign, before he picked up a thigh injury which caused him to miss a few weeks of games from late September. In December, Mee spent £220,000 on Everton midfielder Alan Ball, who took Storey's place in the first eleven for his debut on 27 December. In the new year Storey and numerous other Arsenal players confronted the club's management after learning that Ball was paid £250 a week – more than double most of the rest of the squad. Storey returned to the first team for an FA Cup clash with Derby County on 26 February, as Eddie Kelly was out injured. The next month Arsenal lost three away league games in a row, which all but ended their chances of retaining their title. Storey was out of the team as Arsenal progressed to the quarter-finals of the European Cup – though he did feature in the Second Round victory over Swiss club Grasshopper – and he proved unable to prevent a Johan Cruyff inspired Ajax from claiming a 3–1 aggregate victory. Arsenal progressed past Swindon Town, Reading, Derby County, Orient, and Stoke City to reach the 1972 FA Cup Final. Leeds United limited Arsenal in the final and a headed goal from Allan Clarke was enough to win the cup for Leeds with a 1–0 victory.

Storey failed to pick up a winners medal in the 1972–73 season as Arsenal finished second in the league – three points behind Liverpool – and lost 2–1 to Sunderland in the FA Cup semi-finals. Arsenal had won at Anfield in February, but dropped points in the end of season run-in and ended the season with a 6–1 defeat to Leeds.

Arsenal started the 1973–74 season poorly and exited the League Cup at the hands of Third Division Tranmere Rovers before being knocked out of the FA Cup by Second Division Aston Villa. They eventually finished the league in tenth place, 20 points behind Leeds. The decline continued in the 1974–75 campaign, which ended with Arsenal finishing four places and four points above the relegation zone. Storey was mostly limited to the reserve team during the 1975–76 season, but injuries to Sammy Nelson and Eddie Kelly forced his return to the first team in the build-up to Christmas. On 8 March Storey was suspended by the club after refusing to turn up for work with the reserve team.

Mee retired in the summer of 1976, and his successor was Terry Neill, who was the Arsenal captain when Storey made his debut. He returned to the first team in spells, but the purchase of Alan Hudson in December 1976 spelt the end for Storey at Highbury. Storey played his final game for Arsenal on 29 January 1977, replacing Malcolm Macdonald as a substitute in a 3–1 victory over Coventry City in the FA Cup. He refused to train with the reserves and was again suspended by the club before accepting a free transfer to Fulham in March 1977.

Fulham
When Storey arrived at Craven Cottage, Fulham were one place above the Second Division relegation zone and under the management of Bobby Campbell; training was relaxed and superstar signings George Best, Bobby Moore and Rodney Marsh were past their best. Sttorey played 12 games at the end of the 1976–77 season, helping the "Cottagers" to finish out of the relegation zone. He featured in five league and two cup games at the start of the 1977–78 season, his final appearance as a professional football coming in a 1–0 defeat to Tottenham Hotspur at White Hart Lane on 10 September. His contract with Fulham was cancelled in November 1977 and Storey announced his retirement from football.

International career
Storey made his England debut under Alf Ramsey on 21 April 1971, in a 3–0 win over Greece at Wembley in a qualifying game for UEFA Euro 1972. Despite at the time being used as a midfielder at club level he played at right-back as Ramsey wanted to assess his options at the full-back position; his rivals for the number 2 shirt were Keith Newton (Everton), Emlyn Hughes (Liverpool), Paul Reaney (Leeds United), Chris Lawler (Liverpool), and Paul Madeley (Leeds United). He almost did not play the game as Arsenal manager Bertie Mee ordered both Storey and teammate Bob McNab to pull out of the fixture to play a league game against Burnley the day before, but was allowed to play for England after coach Don Howe persuaded Mee to reconsider his decision. Storey picked up an assist in the match after providing the cross for Francis Lee's late header. His second cap came in a 1–0 British Home Championship win over Northern Ireland at Windsor Park, in which he played in midfield and man-marked George Best.

In 1972, Storey sat on the bench for the first leg of the Euro '72 qualifying quarter-finals match with West Germany, which ended in a 3–1 defeat. He played in the return leg at the Olympiastadion, helping England to secure a 0–0 draw but not a place in the tournament. Despite the respectable draw Ramsey was criticised for naming a negative line-up when England needed a win. His performance in Berlin was the first of a run of 15 successive England appearances for Storey. He played in 1972's three British Home Championship games, helping England to finish joint-first in the tournament after he and Norman Hunter out-battled Billy Bremner, Denis Law and Bobby Moncur at Hampden Park in a 1–0 victory.

He made his final appearance for England in a 2–0 friendly defeat to Italy in Turin on 14 June 1973. He was on the bench for the crucial final game of qualification for the 1974 FIFA World Cup, with Colin Bell favoured in midfield with Paul Madeley and Emlyn Hughes at full-back, as England drew 1–1 and failed to qualify for the tournament. He did though feature in one game for The Football League XI in a 5–0 win over Scottish Football League XI at Maine Road on 20 March 1974, having already featured for The Football League XI in a 2–1 win over the League of Ireland XI in Dublin on 22 September 1971.

Style of play
Storey began his career as a right-back, and soon picked up a reputation as a powerful tackler. Later in his career he was deployed as a defensive midfielder so as to break up opposition play further up the pitch. He gained a reputation as Arsenal's "hard man" in a violent era of British football where clubs would typically employ at least one tough player willing to use dirty play to hurt the opposition and to protect their own generally more skilled players. He later said that he made premeditated tackles from behind early in matches to try and intimidate opponents at a time when referees were reluctant to punish fouls. His rough play was frequently criticised by pundits, though during the 1970s the footballing authorities took little action to try and punish him or any other of football's "hard men". Teammate Bob McNab, quoted in Seventy-One Guns wrote that "Peter was a nightmare for players when he marked them man for man". He was also an efficient taker of penalty kicks, and the only penalties he missed had little bearing on the final result of the match.

Personal life and criminal convictions
His marriage to first wife Susan broke down six months after their marriage in summer 1969. She left him for good in February 1971 after tiring of his self-described "boozy, carefree ways". He met his second wife, Cathy McDonald, at London's Playboy Club in May 1972. The pair began living together before getting married in 1975. The couple had a daughter, Natalie, in December 1976. He married third wife Gill shortly before the arrival of his son, Peter, born in November 1981. His second son, Anthony, was born in December 1982. His third son, Jamie, was born in September 1987. He later divorced Gill and married a Frenchwoman, Daniele Scorceletti. He later split from Daniele and got back together with Gill, before leaving Gill and his three sons to return to Daniele some years later. By 2010 he was in regular contact with his three sons, but has not seen daughter Natalie in decades.

His life began to fall apart in 1975 after he took a three-year tenancy agreement out on the Jolly Farmers pub on north London's Southgate Road. At the time it was common for footballers to invest in pubs, as did other Arsenal teammates. His marriage to Cathy fell apart as he spent more nights at his pub, with the attractions of drink and women, than at home with his wife. He became more dependent on alcohol as his career at Arsenal came to an end. He also invested in a minicab firm in Newington Green, that failed.

He turned to crime when helping local gangsters, the Barry brothers, to counterfeit money by providing finance and storage of the cast die. He was arrested, and whilst on bail set up a brothel called the Calypso Massage Parlour with three women to try and raise enough money to flee to Spain to avoid his trial for conspiracy to produce counterfeit money. He was arrested and pleaded guilty to keeping a brothel on 22 December 1979, and was handed a £700 fine and a six-month suspended sentence. He was also briefly jailed for contempt of court after failing appear at his bankruptcy hearings. 

In September 1980 the trial for conspiracy to produce counterfeit money came to a conclusion and Storey was sentenced to three years imprisonment. He served his time at Wandsworth and Spring Hill. He was handed a 12-month suspended sentence in April 1982 for stealing two cars he had on hire purchase whilst running his minicab firm.

After a time on unemployment benefits he worked on a market stall in Portobello Road. In 1990, he was jailed for 28 days for attempting to import 20 pornographic videos from Europe which he had hidden in a spare tyre. After his release he worked as a minicab driver in Islington ran by Tommy Adams. He spent 1995 in Istanbul working as a chauffeur for Hamad bin Khalifa Al Thani and his entourage. In 2004, he moved to a village near Toulouse in Southern France with Daniele. He sold much of his football memorabilia and medals for £20,000.

In September 2010 he released a no-holds-barred autobiography, True Storey: My Life and Crimes as a Football Hatchet Man; a bio-film project fell through.

Club statistics

Honours
with Arsenal
Football League Cup runner-up: 1968 & 1969
Inter-Cities Fairs Cup winner: 1970
Football League First Division champion: 1970–71
Football League First Division runner-up: 1972–73
FA Cup winner: 1971
FA Cup runner-up: 1972

with England
British Home Championship winner: 1970–71, 1971–72 (shared) & 1972–73

References
Specific

General

People from Farnham
1945 births
Living people
English footballers
England youth international footballers
England international footballers
Association football fullbacks
Association football midfielders
Arsenal F.C. players
Fulham F.C. players
English Football League players
English Football League representative players
English emigrants to France
English counterfeiters
British people convicted of theft
Sportspeople convicted of crimes 
FA Cup Final players